"Hell Yes" is a song by Beck, released as the third and final single from his 2005 album Guero. A remix version by 8-Bit entitled "Ghettochip Malfunction (Hell Yes)" appears on the Hell Yes EP and Guerolito and was released as a single.
Christina Ricci provides the female voice in the track. The song samples Ohio Players' "Far East Mississippi".

Music video
The music video for "Hell Yes" features four QRIOs, developed by Sony Japan. The QRIO is designed to carry on conversations, adapt to its environment, and mimic human movements, including dance routines. Shots of Beck performing this song are imposed on the wall behind the QRIOs. At the time of the video shoot, there were only four working QRIOs in the world—all of which appear in this video. The video was directed by Garth Jennings.

Track listing
"Ghettochip Malfunction (Hell Yes)" – 2:41
"Hell Yes" (album version) – 3:17
"Gucci Bag in Flames (Hell Yes)" – 2:41

Personnel
Beck – vocals, bass guitar, harmonica, vocoder
Christina Ricci – voice
The Dust Brothers – production, drums and samples

See also
 QRIO

References

External links

Beck songs
2005 singles
Songs written by Beck
Song recordings produced by Dust Brothers
2005 songs
Songs written by John King (record producer)
Songs written by Michael Simpson (producer)